John Farrell may refer to:
in sports
John Farrell (manager) (born 1962), American Major League Baseball manager 
John Farrell (second baseman) (1876–1921), American Major League Baseball infielder
John Farrell (speed skater) (1906–1994), American Olympic skater and coach
John Farrell (hurler) (born 1961), Irish hurler
John Farrell (sport shooter) (born 1954), New Zealand sports shooter
Johnny Farrell (1901–1988), American golfer

Other people
John Farrell (bishop) (1820–1873), Canadian Roman Catholic bishop
John Farrell (businessman), General Director at Google Mexico
John Farrell (Australian poet) (1851–1904), Australian journalist and poet
John Farrell (poet) (1968–2010), American poet and composer
John Farrell (VC) (1826–1865), Irish Victoria Cross winner
John A. Farrell, American reporter, and biographer
John H. Farrell (1919–1995), New York politician
John S. Farrell (1880–1938), mayor of Green Bay, Wisconsin
John J. Farrell (1872–1946), Dairy and Food Commissioner of Minnesota

See also 
Jack Farrell (disambiguation)
John Farrell Easmon (1856–1900), Krio doctor
John Ferrell (disambiguation)
John O'Farrell (disambiguation)